Caruso Pascoski, Son of a Pole (Italian: Caruso Pascoski di padre polacco) is a 1988 Italian comedy film directed by Francesco Nuti.

Cast 
Francesco Nuti as Caruso Pascoski
Clarissa Burt as Giulia Pascoski
Ricky Tognazzi as Edoardo Mariotti
Antonio Petrocelli as Caruso's lawyer
Novello Novelli as the carabinieri marshal
Carlo Monni as the snoring man
Narcisa Bonati as the toilet woman
Giovanni Veronesi as the nerd

References

External links

1988 films
Italian romantic comedy films
Films directed by Francesco Nuti
1988 romantic comedy films
1980s Italian-language films
1980s Italian films